This is a list of notable people associated with the National University of Kyiv-Mohyla Academy (NaUKMA), a public research university located in Kyiv, Ukraine. Students, alumni and faculty members of the university and all its predecessor institutions including Kyiv Brotherhood School (KBS), Kyiv-Mohyla Collegium (KMC), Kyiv-Mohyla Academy (KMA) and Kyiv Theological Academy (KTA) are included in this list.

Many students and professors of Kyiv-Mohyla Academy in the 17th and 18th centuries pursued many activities except church career. They were often also writers, philosophers, theologicians and educators in a broad sense. This is indicated in the list where appropriate.

Religion

Politics

Hetmans of Ukraine

Other prominent political figures

Arts and music

Literature

Natural sciences

Humanities and social sciences

Other

Fictional people

Notes

References

NaUKMA notable professors and students  
 

Kyiv-Mohyla Academy people
National University of Kiev-Mohyla Academy